The 2018–19 WPI Engineers men's basketball team represents Worcester Polytechnic Institute during the 2018–19 NCAA Division III men's basketball season. The Engineers, led by 18th-year head coach Chris Bartley, played their home games at Harrington Auditorium in Worcester, Massachusetts as members of the  New England Women's and Men's Athletic Conference (NEWMAC). They finished the regular season 19–9, 8–6 in the NEWMAC play to finish in fifth place. They lost in the championship game of the NEWMAC Tournament for the second consecutive year.

Previous season

The Engineers finished the 2017–18 season 16-11, 8-6 in NEWMAC play to finish in fourth place. In the NEWMAC Tournament, they lost to the MIT in the Championship game and failed to qualify for the 2017 NCAA Men's Division III basketball tournament.

Schedule

|-
!colspan=9 style="background:#AC2B37; color:#FFFFFF;"| Regular season

|-
!colspan=9 style="background:#AC2B37; color:#FFFFFF;"| NEWMAC men's tournament

References

WPI Engineers men's basketball seasons